Philippine Braille or Filipino Braille is the braille alphabet of the Philippines. Besides Filipino (Tagalog), essentially the same alphabet is used for Ilocano, Cebuano, Hiligaynon and Bicol.

Philippine Braille is based on the 26 letters of the basic braille alphabet used for Grade-1 English Braille, so the print digraph ng is written as a digraph  in braille as well. The print letter ñ is rendered with the generic accent point, . These are considered part of the alphabet, which is therefore,

{| class=wikitable
|- align=center
|  a
|  b
|  c
|  d
|  e
|  f
|  g
|  h
|  i
|  j
|- align=center
|  k
|  l
|  m
|  n
|colspan=2|  ñ
|colspan=2|  ng
|  o
|  p
|- align=center
|  q
|  r
|  s
|  t
|  u
|  v
|  w
|  x
|  y
|  z
|}

References

Works cited

  

French-ordered braille alphabets
Tagalog language
Ilocano language
Cebuano language
Hiligaynon language
Bikol languages